Birindelli is an Italian surname. Notable people with the surname include:

Alessandro Birindelli (born 1974), Italian footballer and manager
Gino Birindelli (1911–2008), Italian admiral
Massimo Birindelli (born 1956), Italian sports shooter
Samuele Birindelli (born 1999), Italian footballer

Italian-language surnames